General elections were due to be held in Malawi on 24 May 1976.  The Malawi Congress Party had been the only legally permitted party since 1966. Each of the 70 constituencies had a maximum of five candidates proposed by at least two registered voters. These candidates were then submitted to President-for-life Hastings Banda, who selected a single candidate for each seat. As a result, all 70 candidates were returned unopposed.

Following the election, Banda nominated another 15 members to the National Assembly.

Results

References

Single-candidate elections
1976 in Malawi
Elections in Malawi
One-party elections
Malawi
May 1976 events in Africa
Uncontested elections